Lianglad is a Sino-Tibetan language spoken by Liangmai Naga community in India. It has been called Kwoireng and is particularly close to Zeme and  Rongmei.

Lianglad is spoken in Peren district of Nagaland and Senapati district, Tamenglong district of Manipur.

References 

Languages of Manipur
Zeme languages